The Cessna 205, 206 and 207, known primarily as the Stationair (and marketed variously as the Super Skywagon, Skywagon and Super Skylane), are a family of single-engined, general aviation aircraft with fixed landing gear, used in commercial air service as well as for personal use. The family was originally developed from the popular retractable-gear Cessna 210 and produced by the Cessna Aircraft Company.

The line's combination of a powerful engine, rugged construction and a large cabin has made these aircraft popular bush planes.  Cessna describes the 206 as "the sport-utility vehicle of the air."  These airplanes are also used for aerial photography, skydiving and other utility purposes.  They can also be equipped with floats, amphibious floats and skis.  Alternatively, they can be fitted with luxury appointments for use as a personal air transport.

From 1962 to 2006 Cessna produced 8,509 aircraft in the 205, 206 and 207 variants. The aircraft remains in production.

Development

Cessna 205

The Cessna 205 was introduced late in 1962 as a 1963 model year. The six-seat aircraft was essentially a Cessna 210 with fixed landing gear and with changes to the crew and passenger door arrangement, being officially designated by Cessna as a "Model 210-5". The 205 retained the early 210's engine cowling bulge, originally where the 210 stowed its nosewheel on retraction. This distinctive cowling was made more streamlined on the later Cessna 206.

The 205 is powered by a Continental IO-470-S engine producing .
The 205 was produced in only two model years, 1963 and 1964, before being replaced in production by the Cessna 206.  A total of 576 Cessna 205s were produced.

Cessna 206

The six-seat Model 206 was introduced as a 1964 model and was built until 1986, when Cessna halted production of its single-engined product line.  It was then re-introduced in 1998 and remains in production.

There were many sub-variants, including the U206, P206 all certified to CAR3 standards and later 206H certified to FAR Part 23.
The total Model 206 production between 1964 and 2004 was 6,581 aircraft.

Cessna U206

The original 1964 model was the U206, powered by a  Continental IO-520-A. The “U” designation indicated “utility” and this model was equipped with a pilot side door and large clamshell rear door serving the back two rows of seats, allowing easy loading of oversized cargo.

There was a TU206 turbocharged version powered by the Continental TSIO-520-C engine producing . The extra  was obtained by turning the engine at a higher rpm, and was allowed for only five minutes. Due to the large propeller diameter, the additional engine speed meant that the propeller tips were pushed to transonic speeds, which required much more power.

From 1964 to 1969, the U206 was known as the “Super Skywagon”.  From 1970, it was named the “Stationair”, a contraction of “Station Wagon of the Air”, which is a good description of the aircraft's intended role. Sub-variants were designated U206 to U206G.

Production of all versions of the U206 was halted in 1986 when Cessna stopped manufacturing all piston-engined aircraft.  A total of 5,208 U206s had been produced.

Cessna P206

The P206 was added to the line in 1965. In this case the "P" stood for "passenger", as the P206 had passenger doors similar to the Cessna 210 from which it was derived, on both sides.

Production of the P206 amounted to 647. The name “Super Skylane” made it sound like a version of the Cessna 182, which it was not.  Sub-variants were designated P206 to P206E.

Cessna 206H

After a production hiatus of twelve years, Cessna started manufacturing a new version of the venerable 206 in 1998, with the introduction of the newly certified 206H. The “H” model is generally similar to the previous U206 configuration, with a pilot entry door and a rear double clamshell door for access to the middle and back seats.  The "H" is marketed under the name "Stationair".

The 206H is powered by a Lycoming IO-540-AC1A powerplant producing .

Even though the Cessna 206H is certified as a six-seat aircraft in its country of origin, the Canadian aviation regulator, Transport Canada has certified it to carry only five people in Canada.  This is due to concerns about passenger egress through the rear clamshell door with the flaps extended.  Cessna addressed one part of this problem early on, after a flight-test aircraft was damaged when the pilot extended the flaps while taxiing, and his passenger had the clamshell door open (for ventilation; it was a hot summer day).  A switch was added to the flap actuation circuit which disabled the flaps when the doors were open.  The other part of the problem is that if the flaps are already down, the passenger must perform the complicated procedure of opening the front part as far as possible (about ) then open the rear door and release the spring-loaded rear door handle so it retracts out of the way. This then gives enough clearance to open the rear part of the door fully for egress.

Both the 206H and the T206H remain in production in 2013. By the end of 2004, Cessna had produced 221 206Hs and 505 T206Hs, for a total production of 726 "H" models.
Cessna has indicated that they do not intend to produce a P206-configuration aircraft in the future, due to lack of market demand.

Cessna 207

Thus the propeller's ground clearance was unaffected by the change (the nosewheel had moved forward the same distance as the propeller), but the tail moved aft relative to the mainwheel position, which made landing (without striking the tailskid on the runway) a greater challenge. The move gave that airplane a larger turning radius, since the distance between mainwheels and nosewheel increased by  but the nosewheel's maximum allowed deflection was not increased.

A turbocharged version was equipped with a TSIO-520-G of the same output.

At the beginning of production the model was called a Cessna 207 "Skywagon", but in 1977 the name was changed to "Stationair 7". 1977 also saw a change of engine on the turbocharged version to a Continental TSIO-520-M producing  – the same engine used in the TU206 of the same vintage.

The 207 added a seat in 1980 and was then known as the "Stationair 8".  Production of the 207 was completed in 1984, just two years before U206 production halted.  A total of 626 Cessna 207s were manufactured.

The Cessna Model 207 has been popular with air taxi companies, particularly on short runs where its full seating capacity could be used.  Very few of these aircraft have seen private use.

Modifications

In April 2007, Thielert announced that the European Aviation Safety Agency had granted a Supplemental Type Certificate (STC) for conversion of Cessna 206s to the Thielert V-8 diesel powerplant. The STC allows conversion of the following models: U206F and TU206F with the  powerplant, and the U206G, TU206G, 206H and T206H with the  version. This modification does not require any changes to the engine cowling. In May 2008, Thielert entered insolvency proceedings, so the future availability of this diesel conversion is uncertain.

Soloy Aviation Solutions offers a turboprop conversion for some 206/207 models with the  Rolls-Royce/Allison M250 engine/gearbox package. However, extensive engine cowl modifications are required.

Atlantic Aero offers an FAA STC conversion to the Continental IO-550 powerplant. No cowl modifications are required.

Both Kenmore Air (Edo floats) and Wipaire (Wipline floats) offer seaplane conversions.

Variants

205 (Model 210-5)
205A (Model 210-5A)
206
U206 Super Skywagon
P206
U206A
P206A
P206B
TU206A
TU206B
TP206A
TP206B
U206B
P206C
TP206C
P206D
TP206D
P206E
TP206E

TU206C

TU206D

TU206E

TU206F

206H
T206H

T207 Turbo Skywagon

Certified for eight seats on 11 September 1979.
T207A Turbo Skywagon/Turbo Stationair 8
Certified for eight seats on 11 September 1979.

Operators

Civil
The aircraft is popular with air charter companies and small cargo air carriers, and is operated by private individuals and companies. One of the largest Cessna 207 operators was Yute Air Alaska, which had a fleet of 12 aircraft.

Government

Accidents
July 24, 1972 near Aspen, Colorado, a 27-year-old student pilot with a total of 39 hours of flying time flew into a blind canyon and stalled the aircraft while trying to turn around, killing all four people on board. Among the passengers was wealthy playboy, entrepreneur, racing driver and developer Lance Reventlow, who was a Woolworth heir, son of Barbara Woolworth Hutton and the husband of former Mouseketeer and actress Cheryl Holdridge.

Specifications (206H Stationair)

See also

References

Bibliography 
 Cessna 206H Specifications
 Thielert Aircraft Engines GmbH Press release about Cessna 206 engine development
 Cessna 206 Modifications

External links

Cessna 206 at GlobalSecurity.org

206
1960s United States civil utility aircraft
Single-engined tractor aircraft
High-wing aircraft
Aircraft first flown in 1962